Christ Bearer may refer to:

Christopher (name), a name that roughly translates as "Christ Bearer"
Christotokos, the Greek title of Mary, the mother of Jesus, literally translated as "Christ Bearer"
Christ Bearer (rapper), the stage name of Andre Johnson, a member of the rap group Northstar